Ásgeir Börkur Ásgeirsson (born ) is an Icelandic footballer who plays as a midfielder for Fylkir, whom he joined from Handknattleiksfélag Kópavogs.

Club career
Ásgeirsson was born in Reykjavík, and played for Fylkir's youth teams, before joining lower leagues team UMF Selfoss on loan for two consecutive years in 2007 and 2008. He made his debut for Fylkir in 2008, before going on to make 79 league appearances for the team. During his senior career in Iceland, Ásgeirsson was sent off 4 times and shown 52 yellow cards.

In April 2013, Ásgeirsson signed for Norwegian club Sarpsborg 08 FF on loan for 3 months.

Career statistics

Club

Other
Ásgeirsson is a former member of a heavy metal band, and likes to listen to rock music when preparing for games.

References

External links
 

Icelandic footballers
Living people
1987 births
Iceland international footballers
Icelandic expatriate footballers
Fylkir players
Sarpsborg 08 FF players
Selfoss men's football players
GAIS players
Handknattleiksfélag Kópavogs players
Úrvalsdeild karla (football) players
1. deild karla players
2. deild karla players
Superettan players
Asgeirsson, Asgeir
Asgeirsson, Asgeir
Expatriate footballers in Sweden
Sportspeople from Reykjavík
Association football midfielders